The red-cowled cardinal (Paroaria dominicana) is a bird species in the tanager family (Thraupidae). It is not very closely related to the cardinals proper (Cardinalidae).

It is endemic to Brazil. It occurs in a wide range of dry to semi-humid open to semi-open habitats in north-eastern Brazil, especially the Caatinga region. It has been introduced (probably by means of escaped caged individuals) to Rio de Janeiro and São Paulo, being locally common even in urban areas.

References

External links

Red-cowled Cardinal videos on the Internet Bird Collection
Red-cowled Cardinal photo gallery VIREO Photo-High Res--(Close-up)

red-cowled cardinal
Birds of the Caatinga
Endemic birds of Brazil
red-cowled cardinal
red-cowled cardinal
Taxonomy articles created by Polbot